Viacheslav "Slava" Kravtsov (born 25 August 1987) is a Ukrainian professional basketball player for the Kaohsiung 17LIVE Steelers of the P. League+. He also represents the Ukrainian national basketball team.

Professional career
Kravtsov played in the Ukrainian basketball league for BC Kyiv from 2005 to 2010. Kravtsov declared for the 2009 NBA draft, but after not being selected by a team, he returned to Kyiv to play one additional season. In July 2010, he joined the Boston Celtics for the 2010 NBA Summer League. He then joined BC Donetsk, for which he played from 2010 to 2012.

On 14 July 2012, Kravtsov signed with the Detroit Pistons.

On 31 July 2013, Kravtsov was traded, along with Brandon Knight and Khris Middleton, to the Milwaukee Bucks in exchange for guard Brandon Jennings. On 29 August 2013, Kravtsov and Ish Smith were traded to the Phoenix Suns in exchange for Caron Butler. On 1 March 2014, he was waived by the Suns.

On 16 September 2014, he signed with the Foshan Dralions of China for the 2014–15 CBA season.

In July 2015, he joined the Milwaukee Bucks for the 2015 Las Vegas Summer League. On 30 September 2015, Kravtsov signed a short-term contract with CSKA Moscow, in order to replace injured Joel Freeland. On 26 December 2015, he signed with the Spanish club CAI Zaragoza for the rest of the season. He averaged 11.1 points and 6.5 rebounds at the Eurocup and 8.4 points and 5.4 rebounds at the Liga ACB.

He came back to Spain on 18 October 2016 to sign with Valencia Basket. On 30 June 2017, Valencia announced that they did not renew their contract with Kravtsov.

On 22 July 2017, Kravtsov signed with Turkish club Eskişehir Basket for the 2017–18 season. On 19 July 2018, Kravtsov signed a one-year deal with San Pablo Burgos of the Liga ACB. He spent the 2019-20 season in Japan with San-en NeoPhoenix, averaging 13.8 points and 7.5 rebounds per game. On September 3, 2020, Kravtsov signed with Dnipro of the Ukrainian Basketball SuperLeague.

Career statistics

NBA

Regular season

|-
| align="left" | 
| align="left" | Detroit
| 25 || 0 || 9.0 || .717 || .000 || .297 || 1.8 || .4 || .2 || .4 || 3.1
|-
| align="left" | 
| align="left" | Phoenix
| 20 || 0 || 3.0 || .513 || .000 || .500 || .9 || .1 || .0 || .1 || 1.0
|-class="sortbottom"
| align="left" | Career
| align="left" | 
| 45 || 0 || 6.3 || .672 || .000 || .333 || 1.4 || .2 || .1 || .2 || 2.2

International career
In 2013, Kravtsov helped the Ukrainian national basketball team qualify for their first FIBA World Cup since the break-up of the Soviet Union by leading everyone in the 2013 EuroBasket tournament in blocks made with an average of two blocks per game. At the 2014 FIBA World Cup, he averaged 7.4 points and 5.6 rebounds per game.

References

External links

Viacheslav Kravtsov at draftexpress.com
Viacheslav Kravtsov at eurobasket.com
Viacheslav Kravtsov at euroleague.net
Viacheslav Kravtsov at fiba.com

1987 births
Living people
2014 FIBA Basketball World Cup players
Baloncesto Fuenlabrada players
Basket Zaragoza players
BC Donetsk players
BC Kyiv players
CB Miraflores players
Centers (basketball)
Detroit Pistons players
Eskişehir Basket players
Guangzhou Loong Lions players
Liga ACB players
National Basketball Association players from Ukraine
PBC CSKA Moscow players
Phoenix Suns players
San-en NeoPhoenix players
Sportspeople from Odesa
Ukrainian expatriate basketball people in China
Ukrainian expatriate basketball people in Russia
Ukrainian expatriate basketball people in Spain
Ukrainian expatriate basketball people in Turkey
Ukrainian expatriate basketball people in the United States
Ukrainian expatriate sportspeople in Japan
Ukrainian men's basketball players
Undrafted National Basketball Association players
Valencia Basket players